David Mathenge (born 1 August 1976), better known by his stage name Nameless,  is a Kenyan pop artist.

Music career and education 
Nameless, through his musical talents, has paved the way for many artists in the country to be recognized globally and get opportunities to work with other African artists. He rose to fame in 1999 through a star-search contest on Kenya's urban music station Capital F.M which he won with his original song Megarider. He graduated from the University of Nairobi with a degree in architecture.

Personal life 
In 2005, he married Wahu Kagwi, who is also a musician, and together they have 3 daughters.

Awards

Won
2004 Kisima Music Awards - Best Boomba Pop Artist
2006 Kisima Music Awards - Best Male Artist, Best Afro Fusion & Best Music Video (Sinzia).
2006 Pearl of Africa Music Awards (PAM Awards) - Best Male (Kenya)
2007 Tanzania Music Awards - Best East African Single (Sinzia).
2007 Channel O Music Video Awards - Best Male Video (“Sinzia”) 
2008 Pearl of Africa Music Awards - Best Kenyan Male Artist 
2008 Kisima Music Awards - Male Artist of the Year  & Best Video ("Salari")
2009 Tanzania Music Awards - Best East African Single ("Salari") 
2009 MTV Africa Music Awards - Best Male & Listener's Choice

Nominations 
2004 Kora Awards - Best African Group (Nameless & Mr. Lenny) 
2005 Tanzania Music Awards - Best East African Album ("On Fire")
2006 MTV Europe Music Awards 2006 - Best African Act
2006 Channel O Music Video Awards - Best East African video ("Juju" featuring Mr. Lenny) 
2009 MTV Africa Music Awards - Best Performer

References

External links 
Ogopa DJs official website
MTV Base Africa profile: Nameless
Nameless' profile, lyrics, audio, video, etc

Kenyan musicians
1976 births
Living people
Kikuyu people
Kisima Music Award winners
Alumni of Strathmore School